{|

{{Infobox ship characteristics
|Hide header=
|Header caption=
|Ship class=
|Ship type=Submarine chaser
|Ship tonnage=
|Ship displacement=* standard
 trial
|Ship length=* overall
 waterline
|Ship beam= 
|Ship height= 
|Ship draught= 
|Ship draft= 
|Ship propulsion= 2 × Kampon Mk.22 Model 6 diesels, 2 shafts, 2,600 bhp
|Ship power= 
|Ship speed= 
|Ship range=  at 
|Ship boats=
|Ship troops=
|Ship complement= 59
|Ship capacity=
|Ship crew=
|Ship EW=
|Ship armament=*2 × 40 mm heavy machine guns
36 × depth charges
2 × Type 94 depth charge projectors
1 × depth charge thrower
1 × Type 93 active sonar
1 × Type 93 hydrophone
No.4, November 19442 × 40 mm heavy machine guns
3 × Type 96 25 mm AA guns
36 × depth charges
2 × Type 94 depth charge projectors
2 × depth charge throwers (estimate)
1 × 13-Gō surface search radar
1 × Type 3 active sonar
1 × Type 93 hydrophone
|Ship armour=
}}

History
CH-4 was laid down on 1 January 1938 at the Sakurajima Zosensho shipyard in Osaka, launched on 13 September 1938, and completed and commissioned on 28 December 1938.

SCD 21 was at the time assigned to Rear Admiral Hirose Sueto's 2nd Base Force under Vice Admiral Ibō Takahashi's  Third Fleet. She served mostly on escort duty during the war. On 26 August 1943, while escorting transport Amagisan Maru and fleet oiler Tsurami, she was attacked off the coast of Palau by  captained by Lieutenant Commander James A. Scott; Scott was forced to abandon his efforts after CH-4 damaged his submarine with depth charges.

On 13 August 1945, she hit a mine in the Surabaya Channel and never returned to duty due to the end of the war in August 1945.  She was surrendered to the Allied forces at Bandjermasin, Borneo and later sold to a third party.  She was removed from the Navy list on 3 May 1947.

References

Additional references

1938 ships
No.4-class submarine chasers